The Choquet game is a topological game named after Gustave Choquet, who was in 1969 the first to investigate such games. A closely related game is known as the strong Choquet game.

Let  be a non-empty topological space. The players continue this process, constructing a sequence  If  then Player I wins, otherwise Player II wins. 

It was proved by John C. Oxtoby that a non-empty topological space  is a Baire space if and only if Player I has no winning strategy. A nonempty topological space  in which Player II has a winning strategy is called a Choquet space. (Note that it is possible that neither player has a winning strategy.) Thus every Choquet space is Baire. On the other hand, there are Baire spaces (even separable metrizable ones) which are not Choquet spaces, so the converse fails.  

Every strong Choquet space is a Choquet space, although the converse does not hold.

All nonempty complete metric spaces and compact T2 spaces are strong Choquet. Then the sequence  for all .) Any subset of a strong Choquet space which is a  set is strong Choquet. Metrizable spaces are completely metrizable if and only if they are strong Choquet.

References

Descriptive set theory
Topological games